Phocibidion is a genus of beetles in the family Cerambycidae, containing the following species:

 Phocibidion erythrocephalum (White, 1855)
 Phocibidion pulcherrimum (Martins, 1962)

References

Ibidionini